Thomas Grey (5 March 1885 – 1957) was an English amateur footballer who played as a centre-half in the Football League  for Sunderland and Newcastle United. He was capped by England at amateur level.

Personal life 
Grey served as a private in the Tyne Electrical Engineers during the First World War.

Career statistics

References

1885 births
1957 deaths
People from Whitley Bay
Footballers from Tyne and Wear
English footballers
Sunderland A.F.C. players
Bedlington United A.F.C. players
Newcastle United F.C. players
Blyth Spartans A.F.C. players
English Football League players
British Army personnel of World War I
Tyne Electrical Engineers soldiers
Association football wing halves
England amateur international footballers